"Waiting for Tonight" is a 1997 song by 3rd Party and mostly known for its 1999 rendition by Jennifer Lopez.

Waiting for Tonight may also refer to:

 "Waiting for Tonight", a song by Tom Petty from Playback, with backing vocals from The Bangles
 "Waiting for Tonight", a song by Bad Boys Blue from Tonite
 "Waiting for Tonight", a song by Rick DeJesus
 "Waiting for Tonight", a song by Cheryl Burke
 "Waiting for Tonight", a song from Dance Dance Revolution X2 
 "Waiting for Tonight", a song by Jimmie Mack, 1978
 "Waiting for Tonight", a song by Snips, 1978